Central Depository Services (India) Ltd. (CDSL), the first listed Indian central securities depository, was founded in 1999.

The main function of CDSL facilitates holding and transacting in securities in the electronic form and facilitates settlement of trades on stock exchanges.

CDSL facilitates holding and transacting in securities in the electronic form and facilitates settlement of trades done on stock exchanges. These securities include equities, debentures, bonds, Exchange traded Funds (ETFs), units of mutual funds, units of Alternate Investment Funds (AIFs), Certificates of deposit (CDs), commercial papers (CPs), Government Securities (GSecs), etc.

CDSL is currently the largest depository in India in terms of number of demat accounts opened. On February 28, 2022, CDSL became the first depository in India to open 60-million active demat accounts. The Depository holds assets worth INR 37.2 trillion as on March 31, 2022 and over 580 depository participants are associated with CDSL.

History 

In February 1999, CDSL received certificate of commencement of business from Securities and Exchange Board of India (SEBI). On June 30, 2017, CDSL was listed on the National Stock Exchange (NSE) through Initial Public Offer (IPO) making it the first and the only depository to get listed in Asia-Pacific region and only the second depository in the World to achieve this milestone.

CDSL was initially promoted by BSE Ltd. Currently, the top shareholders are BSE Limited, Standard Chartered Bank, PPFAS Mutual Fund, HDFC Bank and LIC.

CDSL has in place, a robust infrastructure system with multiple back-up levels and has implemented world class information security and cyber security practices. It is thanks to the depository system that paper-based certificates, which were prone to be fake, forged and, counterfeit, resulting in bad deliveries have effectively been eliminated. CDSL offers an efficient and instantaneous transfer of securities held in electronic form in demat accounts.

Today, CDSL is an important part of the Indian Financial Ecosystem and is classified as a Market Infrastructure Institute (MII), providing convenient, dependable, and secure depository services at affordable cost to all market participants.

Services offered 
Depository services: Dematerialisation, Account maintenance, rematerialisation, margin pledge, and Corporate Action.

Other services: 

 “easi” (electronic access to securities information), an internet-based facility which allows BOs to monitor their CDSL demat account at a place and time of their choosing.
“easiest” (electronic access to securities information & execution of secure transactions) is an internet-based facility that allows BOs to submit debit instructions through the internet, thus obviating the need of visiting their DP offices to submit instruction slips.
“smart” (SMS Alerts Related to Transactions) - smart enables BOs registered for this facility to receive SMS alerts in case of any debits or credits related to corporate actions or any change in demographic details in their accounts.
“e-Voting” - An internet-based system through which shareholders can login and register their votes on company resolutions. The system processes and records vote automatically, which facilitates faster processing of voting results.
“eKYC” - An Aadhaar based eKYC service that provides an instant, electronic, non-repudiable proof of identity and proof of address along with date of birth and gender

Subsidiaries

CDSL Ventures Limited (CVL) 
CVL is the ¬first KYC Registration Agency (KRA) registered with SEBI. CVL is also registered as GST (Goods and Service Tax) Suvidha Provider (GSP) with GSTN. CVL provides RTA services to corporates, Aadhaar based eKYC services and Aadhaar based eSign services.

CDSL Insurance Repository Limited (CIRL) 
CIRL is in the business of enabling policy holders to hold life policies, motor policies, health policies and all other types of general (non-life) policies in electronic form.

CDSL Commodity Repository Limited (CCRL) 
CCRL facilitates holding and transfer of commodity assets in electronic form through issuance of electronic Negotiable Warehouse Receipts (eNWRs).

See also
Clearstream
Euroclear
National Securities Depository Limited (NSDL)

References

External links
 Official site

Central securities depositories of India
Financial services companies based in Mumbai
Financial services companies established in 1999
1999 establishments in Maharashtra
Indian companies established in 1999
Companies listed on the National Stock Exchange of India